GASL can refer to:
 General Applied Science Laboratory, purchased by Alliant Techsystems in 2003
 German Academy of Sciences Leopoldina, in German Deutsche Akademie der Naturforscher Leopoldina
 German-American Soccer League, historic name of Cosmopolitan Soccer League
 German acronym for Gesellschaft der Arno-Schmidt-Leser, society for author Arno Schmidt